Ukraine competed at the 2016 Summer Paralympics in Rio de Janeiro, Brazil, from 7 September to 18 September 2016.

Disability classifications

Every participant at the Paralympics has their disability grouped into one of five disability categories; amputation, the condition may be congenital or sustained through injury or illness; cerebral palsy; wheelchair athletes, there is often overlap between this and other categories; visual impairment, including blindness; Les autres, any physical disability that does not fall strictly under one of the other categories, for example dwarfism or multiple sclerosis. Each Paralympic sport then has its own classifications, dependent upon the specific physical demands of competition. Events are given a code, made of numbers and letters, describing the type of event and classification of the athletes competing. Some sports, such as athletics, divide athletes by both the category and severity of their disabilities, other sports, for example swimming, group competitors from different categories together, the only separation being based on the severity of the disability.

Medalists

7-a-side football 

The Ukraine national 7-a-side football team qualified for the Rio Games after finishing second at the 2015 CP World Championships after going down to Russia in the gold medal match.  The country went to the tournament as reigning European champions. The team was in Group C with England and Portugal .

The draw for the tournament was held on May 6 at the 2016 Pre Paralympic Tournament in Salou, Spain.  Ukraine was put into Group A with Brazil, Great Britain and Ireland. The tournament where the draw took place featured 7 of the 8 teams participating in Rio.  It was the last major preparation event ahead of the Rio Games for all teams participating. Ukraine finished first, after defeating Brazil 0 - 2 in the 1st place match.  Their roster for this tournament included Konstiantyn Symashko, Denys Ponomarov, Taras Dutko, Edhar Kahramanian, Yevhen Zinoviev, Stanislav Podolskyi, Volodymyr Antoniuk, Vitaliy Trushev, Artem Krasylnykov, Bohdan Kulynych, Ivan Shkvarlo, Vitalii Romanchuk, Oleh Len and Serhii Zinchenko.

Going into the Rio Games, the country was ranked first in the world.

Archery

Ukraine qualified two archers for the Rio Games following their performance at the 2015 World Archery Para Championships, with both spots coming in the women's recurve open. Roksolana Dzoba-Balyan and Iryna Volynets both qualified the Ukraine after qualifying for the round of sixteen. Dzoba-Balyan is nicknamed Dzoba-Balyan, lives in Lviv and took up the sport in 2007. She is coached by Ilyashenko Oleh.  The right handed archer shoots 27" long arrows with a draw weight of 36 lbs.  In 2015, she was ranked fourth in the world.

Cycling 

With one pathway for qualification being one highest ranked NPCs on the UCI Para-Cycling male and female Nations Ranking Lists on 31 December 2014, Ukraine qualified for the 2016 Summer Paralympics in Rio, assuming they continued to meet all other eligibility requirements.

Goalball 
Ukraine's women enter the tournament ranked 15th in the world.

Judo 

With one pathway for qualification being having a top finish at the 2014 IBSA Judo World Championships, Ukraine earned a qualifying spot in Rio base on the performance of Nataliya Nikolaychyk in the women's -52 kg event.  The B2 Judoka finished first in her class. Inna Cherniak earned the country a second spot in the women's -57 kg event. Iryna Husieva grabbed a third spot for the Ukraine in the women's -63 kg event.

Paracanoeing

Ukraine earned a qualifying spot at the 2016 Summer Paralympics in this sport following their performance at the 2015 ICF Canoe Sprint & Paracanoe World Championships in Milan, Italy where the top six finishers in each Paralympic event earned a qualifying spot for their nation. Oleksandr Hrechko earned the spot for Ukraine after finishing seventh in the men's KL1 event, but as each NPC gets only one spot and another country had two ahead of him, he qualified. Svitlana Kupriianova earned another spot for Ukraine after finishing third in the women's KL1 event. Mykola Syniuk earned a third spot for Ukraine after finishing fifth in the men's KL2 event. Nataliia Lagutenko earned a fourth spot for Ukraine after finishing fourth in the women's KL2 event. Serhii Yemelianov earned a fifth spot for the Ukraine after finishing fifth in the men's KL3 event.

Rowing

One pathway for qualifying for Rio involved having a boat have top eight finish at the 2015 FISA World Rowing Championships in a medal event.  Ukraine qualified for the 2016 Games under this criteria in the AS Men's Single Sculls event with a third-place finish in a time of 04:51.700.  They qualified a second boat in the TA Mixed Double Sculls event with a fourth-place finish in a time of 04:07.280. Ukraine qualified a third boat with a sixth-place finish in the LTA Mixed Coxed Four event in a time of 03:35.510, fifteen seconds behind first-place finisher, Great Britain, who had a time of 03:19.560.

Shooting 

The first opportunity to qualify for shooting at the Rio Games took place at the 2014 IPC Shooting World Championships in Suhl. Shooters earned spots for their NPC.  Ukraine earned a qualifying spot at this event in the R1 – 10m Air Rifle standing men SH1 event as a result of Andrii Doroshenko winning a bronze medal. Iryna Liakhu earned Ukraine a second spot with her finish in the P3 – 25m Pistol Mixed
SH1 event. Vasyl Kovalchuk gave Ukraine a third spot in the R4 – 10m Air Rifle Standing Mixed SH2 event.  Olga Mustafaieva earned her country their final Rio place at this event based on her performance in the P4 – 50m Pistol Mixed SH1 event.

The country sent shooters to 2015 IPC Shooting World Cup in Osijek, Croatia, where Rio direct qualification was also available.  They earned a qualifying spot at this event based on the performance of Oleksii Denysiuk in the P3 – 25m Pistol Mixed SH1 event.

The last direct qualifying event for Rio in shooting took place at the 2015 IPC Shooting World Cup in Fort Benning in November. Iurii Stoviev earned a qualifying spot for their country at this competition in the R1 Men's 10m Air Rifle Standing SH1 event.

Sitting volleyball 

Ukraine men's national sitting volleyball team qualified for the 2016 Games at the 2016 World Qualifier.

Men

Women

Swimming 

The top two finishers in each Rio medal event at the 2015 IPC Swimming World Championships earned a qualifying spot for their country for Rio. Dmytro Vynohradets earned Ukraine a spot after winning gold in the Men's 200m Freestyle S3. A silver in the Mixed 4x50m Freestyle Relay 20pts event gave Ukraine its second spot in swimming in Rio. Kateryna Istomina earned a silver in the Women's 100m Butterfly S8 event to give Ukraine its third spot in Rio. The fourth spot by the Ukraine was earned by Yelyzaveta Mereshko in the Women's 400m Freestyle S6 event where she won a gold medal. Anna Stetsenko earned a fifth spot for Ukraine after winning silver in the Women's 50m Freestyle S13. Hennadii Boiko grabbed a sixth spot for Ukraine in the Men's 100m Backstroke S1 with a gold, while teammate Anton Kol earned another spot by getting a silver in the event. Serhii Palamarchuk earned the country's eighth spot after winning gold in the Men's 100m Backstroke S2.

See also
Ukraine at the 2016 Summer Olympics

References

Nations at the 2016 Summer Paralympics
2016
2016 in Ukrainian sport